A carcinogen  is any substance, radionuclide, or radiation that promotes carcinogenesis (the formation of cancer). This may be due to the ability to damage the genome or to the disruption of cellular metabolic processes. Several radioactive substances are considered carcinogens, but their carcinogenic activity is attributed to the radiation, for example gamma rays and alpha particles, which they emit. Common examples of non-radioactive carcinogens are inhaled asbestos, certain dioxins, and tobacco smoke.  Although the public generally associates carcinogenicity with synthetic chemicals, it is equally likely to arise from both natural and synthetic substances. Carcinogens are not necessarily immediately toxic; thus, their effect can be insidious.

Carcinogens, as mentioned, are agents in the environment capable of contributing to cancer growth. Carcinogens can be categorized into two different types: activation-dependent and activation-independent, and each nature impacts their level and type of influence when it comes to promoting cancer growth. Activation-dependent carcinogens require metabolic activation or modification to induce cancer, while activation-independents ones do not. Examples of activation-dependent carcinogens range from certain viruses, such as HPV, to consumed alcohol, to excessive amounts of red and processed meats, impacting a person's health in ways they may not immediately associate with cancer. Activation-independent carcinogens, such as ultraviolet rays or nitrosamines in tobacco products, possess characteristics enabling them to interact directly with DNA and other cellular components to cause harm. These include not requiring metabolic action or molecular changes to act, which complements their ability to be electrically excited, permitting them to interact with oxygen and nitrogen atoms in negatively charged cellular environments. This type of interaction leads to the alteration of DNA nucleotide bases, causing disarrangement of that genetic material. This disarrangement is also responsible for the formation of DNA adducts, segments of DNA which bind to carcinogens, which furthers harm.  ventually, failure in DNA repair mechanisms will lead to a buildup of DNA damage and potentially the development of cancer.

Cancer is any disease in which normal cells are damaged and do not undergo programmed cell death as fast as they divide via mitosis. Carcinogens may increase the risk of cancer by altering cellular metabolism or damaging DNA directly in cells, which interferes with biological processes, and induces the uncontrolled, malignant division, ultimately leading to the formation of tumors. Usually, severe DNA damage leads to programmed cell death, but if the programmed cell death pathway is damaged, then the cell cannot prevent itself from becoming a cancer cell.

There are many natural carcinogens. Aflatoxin B1, which is produced by the fungus Aspergillus flavus growing on stored grains, nuts and peanut butter, is an example of a potent, naturally occurring microbial carcinogen. Certain viruses such as hepatitis B and human papilloma virus have been found to cause cancer in humans. The first one shown to cause cancer in animals is Rous sarcoma virus, discovered in 1910 by Peyton Rous.  Other infectious organisms which cause cancer in humans include some bacteria (e.g. Helicobacter pylori ) and helminths (e.g. Opisthorchis viverrini  and Clonorchis sinensis).

Dioxins and dioxin-like compounds, benzene, kepone, EDB, and asbestos have all been classified as carcinogenic. As far back as the 1930s, industrial smoke and tobacco smoke were identified as sources of dozens of carcinogens, including benzo[a]pyrene, tobacco-specific nitrosamines such as nitrosonornicotine, and reactive aldehydes such as formaldehyde, which is also a hazard in embalming and making plastics. Vinyl chloride, from which PVC is manufactured, is a carcinogen and thus a hazard in PVC production.

Co-carcinogens are chemicals that do not necessarily cause cancer on their own but promote the activity of other carcinogens in causing cancer.

After the carcinogen enters the body, the body makes an attempt to eliminate it through a process called biotransformation. The purpose of these reactions is to make the carcinogen more water-soluble so that it can be removed from the body. However, in some cases, these reactions can also convert a less toxic carcinogen into a more toxic carcinogen.

DNA is nucleophilic; therefore, soluble carbon electrophiles are carcinogenic, because DNA attacks them. For example, some alkenes are toxicated by human enzymes to produce an electrophilic epoxide. DNA attacks the epoxide, and is bound permanently to it. This is the mechanism behind the carcinogenicity of benzo[a]pyrene in tobacco smoke, other aromatics, aflatoxin and mustard gas.

Radiation 

CERCLA identifies all radionuclides as carcinogens, although the nature of the emitted radiation (alpha, beta, gamma, or neutron and the radioactive strength), its consequent capacity to cause ionization in tissues, and the magnitude of radiation exposure, determine the potential hazard. Carcinogenicity of radiation depends on the type of radiation, type of exposure, and penetration. For example, alpha radiation has low penetration and is not a hazard outside the body, but emitters are carcinogenic when inhaled or ingested.  For example, Thorotrast, a (incidentally radioactive) suspension previously used as a contrast medium in x-ray diagnostics, is a potent human carcinogen known because of its retention within various organs and persistent emission of alpha particles.  Low-level ionizing radiation may induce irreparable DNA damage (leading to replicational and transcriptional errors needed for neoplasia or may trigger viral interactions) leading to pre-mature aging and cancer.

Not all types of electromagnetic radiation are carcinogenic. Low-energy waves on the electromagnetic spectrum including radio waves, microwaves, infrared radiation and visible light are thought not to be, because they have insufficient energy to break chemical bonds. Evidence for carcinogenic effects of non-ionizing radiation is generally inconclusive, though there are some documented cases of radar technicians with prolonged high exposure experiencing significantly higher cancer incidence.

Higher-energy radiation, including ultraviolet radiation (present in sunlight), x-rays, and gamma radiation, generally is carcinogenic, if received in sufficient doses.   For most people, ultraviolet radiations from sunlight is the most common cause of skin cancer.  In Australia, where people with pale skin are often exposed to strong sunlight, melanoma is the most common cancer diagnosed in people aged 15–44 years.

Substances or foods irradiated with electrons or electromagnetic radiation (such as microwave, X-ray or gamma) are not carcinogenic. In contrast, non-electromagnetic neutron radiation produced inside nuclear reactors can produce secondary radiation through nuclear transmutation.

In prepared food 

Chemicals used in processed and cured meat such as some brands of bacon, sausages and ham may produce carcinogens. For example, nitrites used as food preservatives in cured meat such as bacon have also been noted as being carcinogenic with demographic links, but not causation, to colon cancer. Cooking food at high temperatures, for example grilling or barbecuing meats, may also lead to the formation of minute quantities of many potent carcinogens that are comparable to those found in cigarette smoke (i.e., benzo[a]pyrene). Charring of food looks like coking and tobacco pyrolysis, and produces carcinogens. There are several carcinogenic pyrolysis products, such as polynuclear aromatic hydrocarbons, which are converted by human enzymes into epoxides, which attach permanently to DNA. Pre-cooking meats in a microwave oven for 2–3 minutes before grilling shortens the time on the hot pan, and removes heterocyclic amine (HCA) precursors, which can help minimize the formation of these carcinogens.

Baking, grilling or broiling food, especially starchy foods, until a toasted crust is formed generates significant concentrations of acrylamide. This discovery in 2002 led to international health concerns. Subsequent research has however found that it is not likely that the acrylamides in burnt or well-cooked food cause cancer in humans; Cancer Research UK categorizes the idea that burnt food causes cancer as a "myth".

In cigarettes 

There is a strong association of smoking with lung cancer; the risk of developing lung cancer increases significantly in smokers. A large number of known carcinogens are found in cigarette smoke. Potent carcinogens found in cigarette smoke include polycyclic aromatic hydrocarbons (PAH, such as benzo(a)pyrene), benzene, and nitrosamine.

Mechanisms of carcinogenicity 
Carcinogens can be classified as genotoxic or nongenotoxic. Genotoxins cause irreversible genetic damage or mutations by binding to DNA. Genotoxins include chemical agents like N-nitroso-N-methylurea (NMU) or non-chemical agents such as ultraviolet light and ionizing radiation. Certain viruses can also act as carcinogens by interacting with DNA.

Nongenotoxins do not directly affect DNA but act in other ways to promote growth. These include hormones and some organic compounds.

Classification

International Agency for Research on Cancer 
The International Agency for Research on Cancer (IARC) is an intergovernmental agency established in 1965, which forms part of the World Health Organization of the United Nations. It is based in Lyon, France. Since 1971 it has published a series of Monographs on the Evaluation                          of Carcinogenic Risks to Humans that have been highly influential in the classification of possible carcinogens.
 Group 1: the agent (mixture) is definitely carcinogenic to humans. The exposure circumstance entails exposures that are carcinogenic to humans. (Strongest tier for evidence of carcinogenity) 
 Group 2A: the agent (mixture) is probably (product more likely to be) carcinogenic to humans. The exposure circumstance entails exposures that are probably carcinogenic to humans. (There is a bunch of data liking it to carcinogenicity, some may not link it to carcinogenicity)
 Group 2B: the agent (mixture) is possibly (chance of product being) carcinogenic to humans. The exposure circumstance entails exposures that are possibly carcinogenic to humans. (There is some data liking it to carcinogenicity)
 Group 3: the agent (mixture or exposure circumstance) is not classifiable as to its carcinogenicity to humans. (A lack of data can make it fall into this category). Those could still be carginogenic or not. This category might be seen as the "default (or initial) category"
 Group 4: the agent (mixture) is probably not carcinogenic to humans. (There is data mostly indicating [failing to find] that the mixture is carcinogenic).

Globally Harmonized System 
The Globally Harmonized System of Classification and Labelling of Chemicals (GHS) is a United Nations initiative to attempt to harmonize the different systems of assessing chemical risk which currently exist (as of March 2009) around the world. It classifies carcinogens into two categories, of which the first may be divided again into subcategories if so desired by the competent regulatory authority:
 Category 1: known or presumed to have carcinogenic potential for humans
 Category 1A: the assessment is based primarily on human evidence
 Category 1B: the assessment is based primarily on animal evidence
 Category 2: suspected human carcinogens

U.S. National Toxicology Program 
The National Toxicology Program of the U.S. Department of Health and Human Services is mandated to produce a biennial Report on Carcinogens. As of June 2011, the latest edition was the 12th report (2011). It classifies carcinogens into two groups:
 Known to be a human carcinogen
 Reasonably anticipated being a human carcinogen

American Conference of Governmental Industrial Hygienists 
The American Conference of Governmental Industrial Hygienists (ACGIH) is a private organization best known for its publication of threshold limit values (TLVs) for occupational exposure and monographs on workplace chemical hazards. It assesses carcinogenicity as part of a wider assessment of the occupational hazards of chemicals.
 Group A1: Confirmed human carcinogen
 Group A2: Suspected human carcinogen
 Group A3: Confirmed animal carcinogen with unknown relevance to humans
 Group A4: Not classifiable as a human carcinogen
 Group A5: Not suspected as a human carcinogen

European Union 

The European Union classification of carcinogens is contained in the Regulation (EC) No 1272/2008. It consists of three categories:

 Category 1A: Carcinogenic
 Category 1B: May cause cancer
 Category 2: Suspected of causing cancer

The former European Union classification of carcinogens was contained in the Dangerous Substances Directive and the Dangerous Preparations Directive. It also consisted of three categories:
 Category 1: Substances known to be carcinogenic to humans.
 Category 2: Substances which should be regarded as if they are carcinogenic to humans.
 Category 3: Substances which cause concern for humans, owing to possible carcinogenic effects but in respect of which the available information is not adequate for making a satisfactory assessment.
This assessment scheme is being phased out in favor of the GHS scheme (see above), to which it is very close in category definitions.

Safe Work Australia 
Under a previous name, the NOHSC, in 1999 Safe Work Australia published the Approved Criteria for Classifying Hazardous Substances [NOHSC:1008(1999)].
Section 4.76 of this document outlines the criteria for classifying carcinogens as approved by the Australian government. This classification consists of three categories:
 Category 1: Substances known to be carcinogenic to humans.
 Category 2: Substances that should be regarded as if they were carcinogenic to humans.
 Category 3: Substances that have possible carcinogenic effects in humans but about which there is insufficient information to make an assessment.

Common carcinogens

Occupational carcinogens 
Occupational carcinogens are agents that pose a risk of cancer in several specific work-locations:

Disclaimer: The following list is far from being exhaustive.

Others 
 Gasoline (contains aromatics)
 Lead and its compounds
 Alkylating antineoplastic agents (e.g., mechlorethamine)
Styrene
Other alkylating agents (e.g., dimethyl sulfate)
 Ultraviolet radiation from the sun and UV lamps
 Alcohol (causing head and neck cancers)
 Other ionizing radiation (X-rays, gamma rays, etc.)
 Low refining or unrefined mineral oils
 Etc

Major carcinogens implicated in the four most common cancers worldwide
In this section, the carcinogens implicated as the main causative agents of the four most common cancers worldwide are briefly described. These four cancers are lung, breast, colon, and stomach cancers.  Together they account for about 41% of worldwide cancer incidence and 42% of cancer deaths (for more detailed information on the carcinogens implicated in these and other cancers, see references).

Lung cancer
Lung cancer (pulmonary carcinoma) is the most common cancer in the world, both in terms of cases (1.6 million cases; 12.7% of total cancer cases) and deaths (1.4 million deaths; 18.2% of total cancer deaths).  Lung cancer is largely caused by tobacco smoke. Risk estimates for lung cancer in the United States indicate that tobacco smoke is responsible for 90% of lung cancers. Other factors are implicated in lung cancer, and these factors can interact synergistically with smoking so that total attributable risk adds up to more than 100%. These factors include occupational exposure to carcinogens (about 9-15%), radon (10%) and outdoor air pollution (1-2%). Tobacco smoke is a complex mixture of more than 5,300 identified chemicals. The most important carcinogens in tobacco smoke have been determined by a "Margin of Exposure" approach. Using this approach, the most important tumorigenic compounds in tobacco smoke were, in order of importance, acrolein, formaldehyde, acrylonitrile, 1,3-butadiene, cadmium, acetaldehyde, ethylene oxide, and isoprene. Most of these compounds cause DNA damage by forming DNA adducts or by inducing other alterations in DNA.  DNA damages are subject to error-prone DNA repair or can cause replication errors. Such errors in repair or replication can result in mutations in tumor suppressor genes or oncogenes leading to cancer.

Breast cancer
Breast cancer is the second most common cancer [(1.4 million cases, 10.9%), but ranks 5th as cause of death (458,000, 6.1%)].  Increased risk of breast cancer is associated with persistently elevated blood levels of estrogen.  Estrogen appears to contribute to breast carcinogenesis by three processes; (1) the metabolism of estrogen to genotoxic, mutagenic carcinogens, (2) the stimulation of tissue growth, and (3) the repression of phase II detoxification enzymes that metabolize ROS leading to increased oxidative DNA damage.  The major estrogen in humans, estradiol, can be metabolized to quinone derivatives that form adducts with DNA.  These derivatives can cause dupurination, the removal of bases from the phosphodiester backbone of DNA, followed by inaccurate repair or replication of the apurinic site leading to mutation and eventually cancer.  This genotoxic mechanism may interact in synergy with estrogen receptor-mediated, persistent cell proliferation to ultimately cause breast cancer. Genetic background, dietary practices and environmental factors also likely contribute to the incidence of DNA damage and breast cancer risk.

Colon cancer

Colorectal cancer is the third most common cancer [1.2 million cases (9.4%), 608,000 deaths (8.0%)]. Tobacco smoke may be responsible for up to 20% of colorectal cancers in the United States.  In addition, substantial evidence implicates bile acids as an important factor in colon cancer.  Twelve studies (summarized in Bernstein et al.) indicate that the bile acids deoxycholic acid (DCA) or lithocholic acid (LCA) induce production of DNA-damaging reactive oxygen species or reactive nitrogen species in human or animal colon cells.  Furthermore, 14 studies showed that DCA and LCA induce DNA damage in colon cells.  Also 27 studies reported that bile acids cause programmed cell death (apoptosis).  Increased apoptosis can result in selective survival of cells that are resistant to induction of apoptosis.  Colon cells with reduced ability to undergo apoptosis in response to DNA damage would tend to accumulate mutations, and such cells may give rise to colon cancer.  Epidemiologic studies have found that fecal bile acid concentrations are increased in populations with a high incidence of colon cancer.  Dietary increases in total fat or saturated fat result in elevated DCA and LCA in feces and elevated exposure of the colon epithelium to these bile acids.  When the bile acid DCA was added to the standard diet of wild-type mice invasive colon cancer was induced in 56% of the mice after 8 to 10 months.  Overall, the available evidence indicates that DCA and LCA are centrally important DNA-damaging carcinogens in colon cancer.

Stomach cancer
Stomach cancer is the fourth most common cancer [990,000 cases (7.8%), 738,000 deaths (9.7%)].  Helicobacter pylori infection is the main causative factor in stomach cancer.  Chronic gastritis (inflammation) caused by H. pylori is often long-standing if not treated.  Infection of gastric epithelial cells with H. pylori results in increased production of reactive oxygen species (ROS).  ROS cause oxidative DNA damage including the major base alteration 8-hydroxydeoxyguanosine (8-OHdG).  8-OHdG resulting from ROS is increased in chronic gastritis.  The altered DNA base can cause errors during DNA replication that have mutagenic and carcinogenic potential.  Thus H. pylori-induced ROS appear to be the major carcinogens in stomach cancer because they cause oxidative DNA damage leading to carcinogenic mutations.  Diet is thought to be a contributing factor in stomach cancer - in Japan where very salty pickled foods are popular, the incidence of stomach cancer is high.  Preserved meat such as bacon, sausages, and ham increases the risk while a diet high in fresh fruit and vegetables may reduce the risk. The risk also increases with age.

See also

References

External links 

 U.S. National Toxicology Program's Report on Carcinogens
 CDC – Occupational Cancer – Carcinogen List – NIOSH Safety and Health Topic
 Recognized Carcinogens 
 American Cancer Society
 Database of Rodent Carcinogens
 Comparing Possible Cancer Hazards from Human Exposures to Rodent Carcinogens

 
Carcinogenesis
Radiation health effects